Highway 99 is an east-west highway in the Finger of the Galilee in far northeast of Israel and the Golan Heights. It begins in the west at HaMetzodot junction in Kiryat Shmona, and it ends in the east at the Druze city of Mas'ade.  After it reaches the Banias tributary, the road follows the path of Sa'ar River.  Highway 99 is 24 km long.

Junctions & Interchanges on the highway

Places of interest near Highway 99
 Hurshat Tal (חורשת טל)
 Tel Dan (שמורת תל דן)
 Nahal Snir (שמורת נחל שניר)
 Beit Osishkin Museum (מוזיאון בית אוסישקין)
 Banias (בניאס) archaeological site
 Waterfalls of Sa'ar River (נחל סער)
 Resisim Waterfall (מפל רסיסים)
 Odem Forest (יער אודם)
 Birkat Ram (ברכת רם)উঠে 7

See also 
List of highways in Israel

Roads in Israel
Roads in Israeli-occupied territories